Goodlettsville is a city in Davidson and Sumner counties, Tennessee. Goodlettsville was incorporated as a city in 1958 with a population of just over 3,000 residents; at the 2010 census, the city had a total population of 15,921 and in 2020 the population was 17,789. 

The northern half of the city is in Sumner County, while the southern half is in Davidson County. In 1963, when the city of Nashville merged with the government of Davidson County, Goodlettsville chose to remain autonomous.

Geography

History
Long hunter and early Middle Tennessee settler Kasper Mansker was reportedly born on an immigrant ship bound for the American colonies. Little is known about his German ancestry or his early life. Mansker began to explore the wilds of Kentucky and Tennesse with a group of long hunters in 1769. A journey taken in 1772 introduced Mansker to the rich resources of Middle Tennessee, especially what is now Sumner County and Davidson County. Near a salt lick and a large creek now known as Mansker's Creek in the present-day city of Goodlettsville, Mansker established his own fortified station, Mansker's Station, in the winter of 1779-1780, a winter remembered for its severe temperatures.   

Goodlettsville was named for A. G. Goodlett, pastor of the Cumberland Presbyterian Church from 1848 to 1853.

After emancipation of slaves following the American Civil War, the Ku Klux Klan was organized by Confederate veterans to maintain white supremacy over the freedmen. Following the Reconstruction era, violence of whites against blacks continued, often nominally tied to alleged assaults against white women.  In April 1892, two daughters of the white Bruce family of Goodlettsville claimed to have been assaulted. African-American brothers Ephraim and Henry Grizzard were arrested as suspects. Henry was lynched and hanged in the town on April 24, 1892. His brother Ephraim had been jailed in Nashville for the same incident. On April 30, 1892, Ephraim Grizzard was taken from jail and lynched by a mob of 10,000 in the courthouse square. His body was taken to Goodlettsville, where it was burned.

21st century
Among the industries established in Goodlettsville is a Tyson Foods plant. As the  Covid-19 pandemic spread in the state and city in the spring of 2020, the Metro Health department investigated a reported cluster of COVID-19 cases in April among employees working at the plant. They worked in close quarters and had difficulty avoiding contracting the disease, especially at a time when so little was known about its transmission. On April 22, 2020, 120 of the approximately 1,600 employees were confirmed to have been infected with COVID-19. The Centers for Disease Control (CDC) and United States Department of Agriculture (USDA) participated in this investigation. Food processing plants proved to be high-risk environments for frontline employees as the pandemic progressed, although the company instituted social distancing and other measures. By May 22, 2020, some 345 Tyson employees had contracted Covid-19 at this plant. Another nearby plant had been closed to allow deep cleaning.

Demographics

2020 census

As of the 2020 United States census, there were 17,789 people, 6,779 households, and 4,343 families residing in the city.

2000 census
As of the census of 2000, there were 13,780 people, 5,601 households, and 3,825 families residing in the city. The population density was 986.5 people per square mile (380.9/km2). There were 5,853 housing units at an average density of 419.0 per square mile (161.8/km2). The racial makeup of the city was 86.42% White, 9.83% African American, 0.22% Native American, 1.64% Asian, 0.01% Pacific Islander, 0.65% from other races, and 1.23% from two or more races. 1.48% of the population were Hispanic or Latino of any race.

There were 5,601 households, out of which 30.2% had children under the age of 18 living with them, 52.7% were married couples living together, 12.4% had a female householder with no husband present, and 31.7% were non-families. 25.5% of all households were made up of individuals, and 7.7% had someone living alone who was 65 years of age or older. The average household size was 2.44 and the average family size was 2.94.

In the city, the population was spread out, with 23.7% under the age of 18, 8.3% from 18 to 24, 31.3% from 25 to 44, 24.8% from 45 to 64, and 11.9% who were 65 years of age or older. The median age was 37 years. For every 100 females, there were 90.6 males. For every 100 females age 18 and over, there were 86.1 males.

The median income for a household in the city was $45,690, and the median income for a family was $54,159. Males had a median income of $40,567 versus $27,250 for females. The per capita income for the city was $22,946. 9.4% of the population and 7.5% of families were below the poverty line. 18.1% of those under the age of 18 and 5.1% of those 65 and older were living below the poverty line.

Schools and education
Goodlettsville's Davidson County portion has two elementary schools and one middle school: Goodlettsville Elementary School, Gateway Elementary School, and Goodlettsville Middle School.  Goodlettsville schools feed into Metro Nashville Schools' Hunters Lane cluster, meaning that students tend to move from Goodlettsville Middle School to Hunters Lane High School upon completion of 8th grade and promotion to 9th grade.

On the Sumner County side of the line, the only school within the city limits is Madison Creek Elementary School, which feeds to Hunter Middle School and Beech Senior High School in Hendersonville. A portion of the city is zoned for Millersville Elementary, which feeds White House Middle and High Schools.

Goodlettsville residents on the Sumner County side have the option of sending students to Sumner County's Merrol Hyde Magnet School, if the students meet its criteria. Furthermore, residents on the Davidson County side have the opportunity to send students to Head Magnet Middle School, which feeds to Martin Luther King Jr. Academic Magnet, or Meigs Magnet Middle which feeds to Hume Fogg Academic High School. Both Meigs and Head have academic requirements.

Little League World Series
A little league team from Goodlettsville participated in the 2012 Little League World Series in Williamsport, Pennsylvania. They won the United States Championship and qualified to play for the World Series title against the international champion. They were the fifth team from Tennessee to qualify in series history, and the first to play in the championship game.  They lost to a team from Tokyo, Japan in the finals. They were the first Tennessee team to qualify since 1987.  As tournament runners-up, they were the most successful Tennessee team since 1985.  They were the first to win at least two consecutive games since 1974.  And, they were the first Nashville-area team to qualify since 1970.  It was only the second year for little league baseball in Goodlettsville.

In 2016, a second little league team from Goodlettsville qualified for the World Series, the eighth Tennessee team to do so. The 2016 team advanced to the United States championship game, where they lost to a team from New York. They fell one game short of the World Series championship game. The team finished fourth in the world after losing the consolation game against a team from Panama, the international runner-up.

Government
Goodlettsville is incorporated under the City Manager/Commission charter. The Board of Commissioners is made up of five members elected at-large.  The five members select a Mayor and Vice-Mayor within themselves, much like a board selects a chair and vice-chair.  The current mayor is Rusty Tinnin, City Commissioners are Jimmy D. Anderson, Jennifer Duncan, Stuart Huffman and Zach Young.  The Goodlettsville City Commission is elected to serve four-year, alternating terms.  Elections are held every two years. Timothy "Tim" J Ellis was hired as a professional city manager, managing all day-to-day operations of the city.

Local economy and attractions
 Associated Wholesale Grocers, located along Interstate 65—southeast distributor for independent grocers
 Bowen-Campbell House, birthplace and childhood home of William Bowen Campbell, located inside Moss-Wright Park
 Dollar General, Major Corporation with 15,000 stores is headquartered in Goodlettsville
 Forest Lawn Memorial Gardens, a cemetery where many musicians are interred
 Rivergate Mall, located at the corner of Rivergate Parkway and Gallatin Pike (US 31E)
 Tyson Foods, located along Interstate 65—largest fresh meat packaging plant in the world

See also
 April 6–8, 2006 tornado outbreak
 Impact of the 2019–20 coronavirus pandemic on the meat industry in the United States

References

External links
 City of Goodlettsville official website

Cities in Davidson County, Tennessee
Cities in Nashville metropolitan area
Cities in Sumner County, Tennessee
Cities in Tennessee